Joseph E. Slater (1922–2002), was an economist and intellectual entrepreneur who played a key role in the "de-Nazification" of Germany after World War II. He was instrumental in making the Aspen Institute an important East-West conduit in the Cold War and authored the original blueprint for the Peace Corps.

"The central purpose of Joe's Slater's life has been "to create a network of institutions and people who can generate and transmit tremors that will ultimately 'change things' in an orderly way."

Early life 
Slater was born in Salt Lake City in 1922. His family moved in high school to Palo Alto and he attended college at Berkeley where he won Phi Beta Kappa honors and joined the faculty as an instructor in economics.  After Pearl Harbor he enlisted in the Navy and was commissioned an ensign in Boston. He was transferred to the London office to work on plans for post-war Europe. He was one of the first officers in Hitler's bunker after it was bombed.

German reconstruction 
From 1944 to 1954, Slater had a number of crucial posts in Europe and Washington as postwar European alliances emerged and as Germany became a modern democracy. As hostilities drew to a close, he helped work on the Four Power Allied Control Council, which controlled Germany after its defeat. On this assignment he met his wife and lifelong partner, Annelore Kremser. Ms. Kremser was a German Jew who had fled Germany in the 1930s as a teenager and had returned with the US military to find her parents who had been hiding during the war.

Until 1948, Slater served as the deputy United States secretary to the council when he moved to the policy planning staff at the State Department to help form the United Nations.  In 1949, Slater was named Secretary General of the Allied High Commission in Germany and three years later moved to Paris where he served as executive secretary in the office of the United States representatives to NATO and the Organisation for European Economic Co-operation, set up under the Marshall Plan.

Civil society 
Slater returned from Europe in the 1950s and served as the chief economist for Creole Petroleum, a subset of Standard Oil Company. While at Creole Petroleum, Slater founded and served as the Executive Director of Fundación Creole, the philanthropic arm of the corporation. In 1957 Slater joined the international affairs program of the Ford Foundation.  At the Ford Foundation he played a key role in lobbying the US to recognize China. During his time at the Ford Foundation, Slater was named the Secretary of President Eisenhower's Commission on Foreign Assistance, or the Draper Committee. With the election of John F. Kennedy he was named deputy assistant secretary of state for educational and cultural affairs where he wrote the blueprint for the Peace Corps.  His vision for working across sectors and fields then earned him the appointment as the president of the Salk Institute for Biological Studies.

Aspen Institute 
Slater became President and Chief Executive of the Aspen Institute in 1969. He partnered with Robert O. Anderson in "refounding" the institute. Under his direction, the Aspen Institute, which had been a small organization that specialized in educational seminars for executives, increased its range and scale, becoming a well-known meeting place for world leaders, scholars, and scientists on international issues.

The institute worked closely with the United Nations and played an important role in mobilizing world opinion on environmental questions. In 1973, Slater won German backing to open a branch in Berlin. It quickly became a center for informal contacts between officials and others from both sides of the Iron Curtain. Slater scaled the institute around the globe with offices in France, Italy, Japan and South Korea. He retired from the Aspen Institute in 1986.

In the 1975 book, The Aspen Idea, Sidney Hyman describes Slater using these quotes from friends of the Aspen Institute (page 229):
 "a master of the art of combination"
 "America's #1 generalist"
 "a man born to have no rest himself, and to allow none to others"
 "a stranger to cynicism"
 "a genius at discovering approximate solutions to impossible financial problems"
 "a three-stage rocket with all three stages firing simultaneously"
 "the nation's most imaginative philosopher of philanthropy"
 "an exceptional talent for friendship"

Later life 
In 1986 Slater helped found The John J. McCloy International Center, in honor of his mentor and friend John J. McCloy. In 1988 Slater began his term as the Director of Volvo North America's Public Issues Review Committee. In this role he helped determine which organizations would receive grants from Volvo. 

In the 1990s Slater served as a trustee for a number of important organizations. These include the Academy for Educational Development, the President's Circle for the National Academy of Science, the Eisenhower Exchange Fellowship, and the Institute for East-West Dynamics. 

Slater died in 2002 from Parkinson's disease. He was survived by his wife Annelore and daughter Sandra. Annelore has since passed away.

External links
 Joseph E. Slater Papers at the Columbia University Rare Book & Manuscript Library

References 

20th-century American economists
1922 births
2002 deaths
Scientists from Salt Lake City
University of California, Berkeley alumni
Economists from Utah
United States Navy personnel of World War II
American expatriates in the United Kingdom
American expatriates in Germany